In Greek mythology, Aristas was an Arcadian king as the son of Parthaon, descendant of King Lycaon of Arcadia. He was the father of Erymanthus, ancestor of Psophis.

Note

References 

 Pausanias, Description of Greece with an English Translation by W.H.S. Jones, Litt.D., and H.A. Ormerod, M.A., in 4 Volumes. Cambridge, MA, Harvard University Press; London, William Heinemann Ltd. 1918. . Online version at the Perseus Digital Library
 Pausanias, Graeciae Descriptio. 3 vols. Leipzig, Teubner. 1903. Greek text available at the Perseus Digital Library.

Princes in Greek mythology
Mythological kings of Arcadia
Kings in Greek mythology
Arcadian mythology